Abigail Daniella Phillip (born November 25, 1988) is an American journalist who works as a political correspondent and weekend anchor for CNN. She previously worked for The Washington Post, ABC News, and Politico.

Early life and education
Phillip, born 1988, is of Afro-Trinidadian descent. She was born in Virginia to June Phillip, now a realtor, and Carlos Phillip, a teacher and later an educational psychologist. She has five siblings. 

When she was a child, the family briefly moved back to Trinidad and Tobago and returned to the U.S. when she was nine years old. Phillip grew up in Bowie, Maryland, and attended Bowie High School.  In 2010, she graduated from Harvard University with a Bachelor of Arts in government, after originally intending to study premed. At Harvard, Phillip wrote for The Harvard Crimson.

Career 
Phillip joined CNN in 2017 and covered the Trump Administration. Before CNN, she worked at The Washington Post, where her roles included national political reporting and general assignments. She also worked at ABC News, where she was an ABC News Fellow and digital reporter in New York City, and has appeared as a guest on C-SPAN multiple times. Phillip began her journalism career as a White House reporter and blogger for Politico, covering campaign finance issues and lobbying.  She appears occasionally on Washington Week with Robert Costa on PBS. 

Phillip co-moderated the seventh Democratic debate of the 2020 Democratic Party presidential primaries at Drake University on January 14, 2020. She was criticized for what some people said was unfair treatment of Bernie Sanders in moderating the debate.

In 2020, she landed a deal with Flatiron Books for The Dream Deferred, a book she is writing about Reverend Jesse Jackson’s run to become the 1988 Democratic presidential nominee. The release date has been announced for 2022.

On January 11, 2021, Phillip was announced as the new anchor, starting January 24, of the weekend edition of Inside Politics, replacing John King on the Sunday morning version of the political talk show. (John King continues to host on weekdays.) The weekend show is called Inside Politics Sunday With Abby Phillip.

Personal life 
Phillip lives in Washington, D.C., with her husband, Marcus Richardson. Phillip and Richardson were married at the Larz Anderson House in May 2018. The couple announced they were expecting their first child in 2021. She is an honorary member of Delta Sigma Theta sorority.

References

External links

Q&A with Phillip, Washington Post (video)

1988 births
21st-century American journalists
African-American women journalists
African-American journalists
American people of Trinidad and Tobago descent
American women television journalists
CNN people
Harvard University alumni
Journalists from Maryland
Living people
People from Bowie, Maryland
The Washington Post journalists
Journalists from Virginia
21st-century American women
21st-century African-American women
21st-century African-American people
20th-century African-American people
20th-century African-American women
The Harvard Crimson people